Frederick Hesley Belden (September 25, 1909 - November 4, 1979) was the tenth Bishop of the Episcopal Diocese of Rhode Island.

Early life, education, and family
The son of Stacy Beardsley Denn Belden and Emma May Hesley, he attended Hartwick College, where he earned his B.A. in 1932. He went on the study at the General Theological Seminary, where he earned an S.T.B. in 1936 and in 1970, was awarded an S.T.D. degree. He married Dorothy Elizabeth Reumann on November 26, 1936. They had four children.

Career
Ordained to the ministry of the Episcopal Church, first as deacon on June 16, in 1935 and then priest in June 1936. He first served as rector of Christ Church, Duanesburg, New York for a year, when he was called to be rector of Christ Church, Walton, New York from 1937 to 1942. From there, he became rector of St John's Church, Johnstown, New York from 1942 to 1949. He first came to Rhode Island to become rector of St. Paul's Church, Wickford, Rhode Island in 1949. while rector there, he served as President of the Rhode Island State Council of Churches in 1964-65 and warden of the Guild of Ascension, 1961–69.

In 1971, he was elected Bishop Coadjutor of the Diocese of Rhode Island. He succeeded Bishop Higgins the following year and remained Bishop of Rhode Island until his death in 1979.  Noteworthy during his time as president of the Rhode Island State Council of Churches and especially during his time as bishop were his ecumenical efforts as evidenced, in part, by formation of a covenant relationship between twelve parishes of the Diocese of Rhode Island and the Roman Catholic Diocese of Providence.  These efforts were recognized with the award of honorary doctorate degrees by Brown University and Providence College.

He was buried at the Old Narragansett Church.

References

1909 births
1979 deaths
People from Watertown, New York
American Episcopal priests
American religious leaders
Hartwick College alumni
General Theological Seminary alumni
Burials in Rhode Island
20th-century American Episcopalians
Episcopal bishops of Rhode Island
20th-century American clergy